Bhagwat Singh Mewar (20 June 1921 - 3 November 1984) was the titular ruler of the Indian princely state of Udaipur or Mewar from 1955 until the Indian government abolished all royal titles in 1971. Bhagwat Singh was born in 1927, three years after the accession of his father Bhupal Singh to the throne of Mewar and Udaipur as Maharana.

Personal life 

In the 26th amendment to the Constitution of India promulgated in 1971, the Government of India abolished all official symbols of princely India, including titles, privileges, and remuneration (privy purses). Bhagwat Singh succeeded him as the titular ruler of the state.

Some of Bhagwat Singh's palaces were Jag Niwas, on an island in Lake Pichola, and Monsoon Palace, both since used for the filming of several films, including the James Bond film Octopussy in 1983.

Cricket career 

Bhagwat Singh played 31 first-class matches and scored 846 at an average of 18.35 and also took five wicket in his career spanning from 1945–46 to 1961–62, He played for both Rajputana cricket team as well as its successor Rajasthan cricket team.

References 

Mewar dynasty
1921 births
1984 deaths
Indian cricketers
Rajasthan cricketers
Central Zone cricketers